Jesper Lindgren (born 19 May 1997) is a Swedish professional ice hockey defenceman. He is currently under contract with IF Björklöven of the HockeyAllsvenskan (Allsv).

Playing career
Lindgren originally played at the youth levels with IF Björklöven before transferring to Modo Hockey as an 18-year-old on 7 May 2013. Lindgren later made his Swedish Hockey League debut playing with Modo Hockey during the 2014–15 SHL season. Lindgren was drafted 95th overall in the 2015 NHL Entry Draft by the Toronto Maple Leafs.

On 14 March 2018, after completing his debut 2017–18 Liiga season with HPK, Lindgren was offered an amateur tryout with the Toronto Marlies, the farm team of the Maple Leafs. He appeared in 4 games with the Marlies to end the regular season before he was released during their post-season push on May 1, 2018. Lindgren later agreed to a three-year, entry-level contract with the Toronto Maple Leafs on May 18, 2018.

On 17 September 2018, after attending the Maple Leafs training camp, Lindgren was returned on loan to HPK for the 2018–19 season.

On 9 August 2020, Lindgren returned to Modo Hockey of the Allsvenskan on loan from the Maple Leafs to begin the 2020–21 season.  On 25 August 2020, Lindgren was involved in a six player deal that saw him traded by the Maple Leafs to the Pittsburgh Penguins along with Kasperi Kapanen and Pontus Åberg in exchange for Evan Rodrigues, David Warsofsky, Filip Hållander and the 15th overall pick in the 2020 NHL Entry Draft.

Career statistics

Regular season and playoffs

International

Awards and honours

References

External links

1997 births
HPK players
IF Björklöven players
Living people
Modo Hockey players
Swedish ice hockey defencemen
Toronto Maple Leafs draft picks
Toronto Marlies players
Sportspeople from Umeå